The Bamberg Symphony (German: Bamberger Symphoniker – Bayerische Staatsphilharmonie) is a German orchestra based in Bamberg.  It is one of the most prestigious orchestras in Germany. The orchestra was formed in 1946 mainly from German musicians expelled from Czechoslovakia after WWII, who had previously been members of the German Philharmonic Orchestra of Prague.  The orchestra received the title of Bayerische Staatsphilharmonie (Bavarian State Philharmonic) in 1993.  The orchestra commemorated its 60th anniversary on 16 March 2006.

Since 1993, the home of the orchestra is the Konzert- und Kongresshalle (Concert and Congress Hall), which has the nickname Sinfonie an der Regnitz (Symphony on the Regnitz).  Concerts before 1993 were given at the Dominikanerbau.  The orchestra receives financial support from the Free State of Bavaria, the city of Bamberg, Oberfranken district and the district of Bamberg.  The government of Bavaria retired the orchestra's financial debts in 2003.

Joseph Keilberth was the orchestra's first principal conductor. Other principal conductors have included James Loughran, Horst Stein and Jonathan Nott. In September 2016, Jakub Hrůša became the fifth Chief Conductor of the Bamberg Symphony, with an initial contract of four seasons.  In June 2018, the orchestra announced the extension of Hrůša's contract as its chief conductor through the 2025–2026 season.  Herbert Blomstedt was named honorary conductor of the orchestra in March 2006.  Christoph Eschenbach became honorary conductor of the orchestra in 2016.

The orchestra is associated with the triennial Gustav Mahler Conducting Prize, established during Nott's tenure, and the first competition laureate in 2004 was Gustavo Dudamel.  The orchestra has made a number of recordings for Vox Records with Jonel Perlea and János Fürst, some of which have been reissued on CD.  It also recorded music of Joaquin Turina for RCA Records with conductor Antonio de Almeida.

Principal conductors
 Joseph Keilberth (1949–1968)
 James Loughran (1979–1983) 
 Witold Rowicki (1983–1985)
 Horst Stein (1985–1996)
 Jonathan Nott (2000–2016)
 Jakub Hrůša (2016–present)

World premieres
Hans-Jürgen von Bose: Werther-Szenen. Ballett (1989)
Moritz Eggert: Adagio – An Answered Question (1996, conductor: Horst Stein)
Gottfried von Einem: Nachtstück (op. 29, 1962, conductor: Joseph Keilberth)
York Höller: Aufbruch (1989, conductor: Hans Zender)
Rudolf Kelterborn: Sinfonie Nr. 4 (1987, conductor: Horst Stein)
Ezra Laderman: Symphony No 2, The Luther Symphony (1 January 1970, conductor: Alfredo Antonini)
Horst Lohse: Bamberg Symphony (1986, conductor: Horst Stein); Die vier letzten Dinge (Quasi una Sinfonia da Requiem) (1997, conductor: Aldo Brizzi)
Bruno Mantovani: Mit Ausdruck (2003, conductor: Jonathan Nott); Time stretch (on Gesualdo) (2006, conductor: Jonathan Nott)
Wolfgang Rihm: Verwandlung 4 (2008, conductor: Jonathan Nott)
Mark-Anthony Turnage: Juno and The Torino Scale (from: Asteroids for Orchestra) (2007, conductor: Jonathan Nott)
Jörg Widmann: Lichtstudie I (2001, conductor: Christoph Poppen), Lied für Orchester (2003, conductor: Jonathan Nott)

References

External links
 Bamberger Symphoniker official German-language webpage
 Bamberger Symphoniker official English-language webpage

Bamberger Symphoniker at the Bach Cantatas Website
CD/SACD Releases with the Bamberger Symphoniker by Tudor Recording Zurich

German symphony orchestras
Musical groups established in 1946
1946 establishments in Germany